Love My Life is a Japanese manga series written and illustrated by Ebine Yamaji. It was originally serialized in the josei manga magazine Feel Young from 2000 to 2001, and collected in a single tankōbon volume released on September 8, 2001. The single volume has been translated into Mandarin and released by Taiwan Kadokawa and is available internationally on several Asian online shops like YesAsia. The film based on this manga was produced in 2006, and the DVD was released on May 4, 2007 and was released in the United States by Wolfe Video.  It was also shown in Los Angeles on December 2, 2007.

Story
Ichiko Izumiya is an eighteen-year-old woman who goes to language school in university and works part-time at a music store. She lives with her father, Housei Izumiya, who translates English novels into Japanese for a living. Her mother died seven years before the story begins. Ichiko also has a girlfriend named Eri Joujima.  When she comes out as a lesbian to her father, her father shocks her by telling her that both he and her mother are also gay. They had wanted to raise a child, and had agreed to marry in name to raise a child in Japan, while mutually being in their own relationships. The rest of the story shows Ichiko meeting her parents' lovers, her daily life and love with Eri.

Characters / Cast

Characters in both manga and film, with name of actors in film shown in parenthesis) 
Ichiko Izumiya (Rei Yoshii)
Eri Joujima (Asami Imajuku)
Housei Izumiya (Ira Ishida)
Take-chan (Issei Takahashi)
Yukako (Kami Hiraiwa)
Akira (Takamasa Suga)
Customer at CD Shop (Chiharu Kawai)
Eri's father (Ken Teraizumi)
Chinami (Naomi Akimoto)
Kengo Tachibana (Hiroyuki Ikeuchi)
Professor Saeko (Miyoko Asada)
Ichiko's mother (Kyōko Koizumi)

See also
Tokyo International Lesbian & Gay Film Festival

References

External links

2006 LGBT-related films
Live-action films based on manga
Japanese LGBT-related films
2000s Japanese-language films
Josei manga
Lesbian-related films
Romance anime and manga
Shodensha manga
Yuri (genre) anime and manga
2000s Japanese films